The men's 25 kilometres was one of three cycling events, all track cycling, on the Cycling at the 1900 Summer Olympics programme that were open to all amateurs, had more than one nation participating and no handicapping. It was held on 15 September. Ten cyclists competed. Four had already competed in the sprint event. The result of the race proved Louis Bastien of France to be the top long-distance cyclist present, while Louis Hildebrand finished in second and Auguste Daumain in third. One of the contestants, Louis Trousselier, would go on to win the 1905 Tour de France. Prizes were awarded to the top four finishers: art objects valued at 400 francs (for first place), 300 francs (for second), 200 francs (third), and 100 francs (fourth).

Background

From 1896 to 1924 (excluding 1912, when no track events were held), the track cycling programme included events at a variety of distances that changed from Games to Games and ranged from the -mile to the 100 kilometres (and, even longer, the unique 12 hours race in 1896 that saw finishers exceed 300 kilometres). The 25 kilometres was held only in 1900. Louis Bastien was the favorite, having won the 100 kilometres world championship, with John Henry Lake (the sprint bronze medalist) and Louis Hildebrand also expected to do well.

Competition format

As the name suggests, the race was 25 kilometres in length. The track was 500 metres in length, so there were 50 laps. A single race was held.

Schedule

Results

Bastien took the lead early. Lake and Hildebrand were close behind, until Lake dropped out. Bertrand was 3 laps behind.

References

 International Olympic Committee medal winners database
 De Wael, Herman. Herman's Full Olympians: "Cycling - track 1900". Accessed 19 March 2006.
 

Track cycling at the 1900 Summer Olympics
Olympic track cycling events